Bmycharity was a company that provided online sponsorship and donation processing services to UK charities and their supporters. Fundraisers were able to set up individual fundraising pages where the public was able to make donations using bank cards. The funds were subsequently transferred to the fundraiser, after a deduction of an administration fee.

Bmycharity was used by charities such as Oxfam, Cancer Research UK and World Vision as well as many much smaller organisations.

History 

Bmycharity was set up in 2000 by Ben Brabyn and Matt Cooper.  BMY Limited was privately held, employing 4 people based in London.  In 2007, the company launched a related service – Giftshare – designed to bring the capabilities of Bmycharity to a wider audience and new market.

On 10 March 2010 the decision was taken to withdraw the service as of 31 March 2010. Shortly before the site closed, it was revealed that Bmycharity had helped raise over £28million for over 300 charities.

Less than a week later however, Bmycharity was purchased by the charity Help for Heroes to form BmyHero Ltd, but trade under the same name, Bmycharity. The aim of the purchase was "to continue to provide an online, commission free donations facility for UK Registered Charities and to fund this low cost site by focusing on encouraging supporters to make as many Help for Heroes donations through Bmycharity as possible".

In January 2015, the decision was made to cease any further investment in Bmycharity. From 1 April 2015, Bmycharity no longer accepted new registrations. The service closed on 31 December 2015.

References

External links
 

Online financial services companies of the United Kingdom